Stuart Jeff Rabner (born June 30, 1960) is the chief justice of the New Jersey Supreme Court. He served as New Jersey Attorney General, Chief Counsel to Governor Jon Corzine, and as a federal prosecutor at the U.S. Attorney's Office for the District of New Jersey.

Biography
Rabner grew up in Passaic, New Jersey, and graduated from Passaic High School in 1978, where he was the class valedictorian. He graduated summa cum laude with an A.B. from the Woodrow Wilson School of Public and International Affairs at Princeton University in 1982 after completing a 172-page long senior thesis titled "A Commitment Compromised: The Treatment of Nazi War Criminals by the United States Government." He then graduated cum laude from Harvard Law School in 1985. He is a resident of Caldwell. He was married in 1989 to Dr. Deborah Ann Wiener, and has three children: Erica, Carly, and Jack. In June 2007, he was named the most influential political personality in the state of New Jersey. In 2010, his name was proposed as a nominee to the U.S. Supreme Court to replace Associate Justice John Paul Stevens.

Appointment as Chief Justice
On June 4, 2007, Governor Corzine nominated Rabner to be Chief Justice of the New Jersey Supreme Court, replacing James R. Zazzali, who was nearing the mandatory retirement age.

Shortly after the nomination, two members of the New Jersey Senate from Essex County, where Rabner resides, blocked consideration of his confirmation by invoking "senatorial courtesy", a Senate tradition that allows home county legislators to intercede to prevent consideration of a nominee from the counties they represent. State Senator Ronald Rice had initially blocked the nomination, but relented on June 15, 2007, after a meeting with the governor. Senator Nia Gill dropped her block on June 19, 2007, but did not initially explain the nature of concerns. (Anonymous lawmakers cited in The New York Times indicated that the objection was due to Rabner's race and Governor Jon Corzine's failure to consider a minority candidate for the post.)

With the Senators permitting consideration of his nomination, Rabner was swiftly approved by the Senate Judiciary Committee, with Gill casting the only negative vote. On June 21, 2007, the New Jersey Senate confirmed Rabner as Chief Justice by a vote of 36–1, with Gill again casting the lone dissenting vote.

Rabner was sworn in as chief justice on June 29, 2007, with Acting Chief Justice Virginia Long administering the oath of office. On May 21, 2014, Governor Chris Christie renominated Rabner as Chief Justice despite their political differences, after a compromise was reached with State Senate Democrats, breaking a longstanding impasse over Supreme Court appointments. The Senate Judiciary Committee confirmed the nomination on June 14, 2014.

Attorney general
Rabner served as Attorney General of New Jersey in the cabinet of New Jersey Governor Jon Corzine. He took office as attorney general on September 26, 2006. Rabner was nominated by Governor Corzine on August 24, 2006, to replace former Attorney General Zulima Farber who resigned and left office on August 31, 2006.

Other positions
After beginning his career as an Assistant United States Attorney, Chief Justice Rabner worked in a number of positions including first Assistant United States Attorney and chief of the terrorism unit in the office of the United States Attorney for the District of New Jersey. He was chief of the office's criminal division, focusing on public corruption issues, and supervising 100 attorneys and staff, when he was named chief counsel to Governor Corzine in January 2006. He was viewed as a surprise choice for the chief counsel position, as it traditionally goes to individuals with strong political connections and not to career prosecutors. Rabner began his legal career as a judicial law clerk to Judge Dickinson R. Debevoise of the United States District Court for the District of New Jersey before joining the office of the United States Attorney for the District of New Jersey in Newark in 1986.

Decisions
In 2011, Chief Justice Rabner authored a landmark decision on eyewitness identification evidence in State v. Henderson. The ruling questioned the longstanding test for admitting eyewitness identifications at trial. Henderson outlined a new standard under the New Jersey Constitution in light of more recent, accepted social science evidence on the risks of misidentification. The following year, the NJ Supreme Court released expanded model jury instructions on eyewitness identifications for use in criminal cases, consistent with the Henderson decision.

In 2013, Chief Justice Rabner broke new legal ground in a decision about the right to privacy in the location of one's cell phone. The opinion in State v. Earls marked the first time a state supreme court found a right of privacy in cell-phone location information. In light of recent advances in technology, the Earls decision noted that cell-phone providers in 2013 can pinpoint the location of a person's cell phone with increasing accuracy. That information can provide an intimate picture of one's daily life and reveal not only where people go – which doctors, religious services, and stores they visit – but also the people and groups they choose to affiliate with. The opinion held that, under the State Constitution, cell-phone users are reasonably entitled to expect confidentiality in the location of their cell phones. As a result, to obtain cell-phone location information, police must obtain a search warrant based on a showing of probable cause or qualify for an exception to the warrant requirement, such as exigent circumstances.  In 2018, the United States Supreme Court ruled in Carpenter v. United States  that historical cell-phone location information is protected by the Fourth Amendment, and the government must get a search warrant to acquire that type of record.

Also in 2013, Chief Justice Rabner authored a unanimous decision denying the state's application for a stay of a trial court order permitting same-sex couples to marry. Garden State Equality v. Dow The ruling was the first by a State Supreme Court in the wake of the United States Supreme Court's decision in United States v. Windsor. Windsor struck down part of the federal Defense of Marriage Act (DOMA) and held that DOMA violated the federal constitution by denying lawfully married same-sex couples the benefits given to married couples of the opposite sex. In the wake of that decision, a number of federal agencies extended federal benefits to married same-sex couples but not to partners in civil unions. Under New Jersey state law, same-sex couples could enter into civil unions but could not marry. As a result, the New Jersey Supreme Court concluded that the state constitution's guarantee of equal protection for same-sex couples was not being met; that the harm to same-sex couples was real, not speculative; and that the public interest did not favor a stay. Three days after the ruling, same-sex couples began to marry, and the state withdrew its appeal of the trial court order, effectively ending the litigation.

In 2017, Chief Justice Rabner authored a significant ruling in the area of juvenile justice. In State v. Zuber & Comer, New Jersey's high court unanimously extended recent rulings by the U.S. Supreme Court and directed that state trial judges consider various factors related to youth before imposing a sentence that is the practical equivalent of life without parole.

Also in 2017, the Chief Justice wrote for a unanimous court that footage from dashboard cameras must be made public when the police use fatal force. In North Jersey Media Group v. Lyndhurst, the court concluded that once the principal witnesses to the shooting have been interviewed, the public's powerful interest in transparency calls for the release of police dash-cam videos under the common law right of access. More detailed investigative reports and witness statements, which if released would impair the integrity of an ongoing investigation, are not ordinarily subject to disclosure while an investigation is underway.

In Freedom From Religion Foundation v. Morris County, at 232 N.J. 543 (2018)]  the Chief Justice authored a 2018 opinion that struck Morris County's award of $4.6 million in historic preservation grant funds to restore twelve churches. The Court held that the grants ran afoul of the State Constitution's Religious Aid Clause, which dates back to 1776 and bars the use of taxpayer funds to repair churches. The grants funded repairs of church buildings that housed regular worship services. The Court found that the application of the Religious Aid Clause in the case did not violate the First Amendment's Free Exercise Clause under current law, including the U.S. Supreme Court's recent decision in Trinity Lutheran Church of Columbia, Inc. v. Comer.

Initiatives 
The Chief Justice has launched a series of initiatives to implement reforms in the state's municipal courts, enlist volunteers to monitor court-appointed guardians, improve the handling of complex commercial cases, assist veterans, promote access and fairness in the court system, and introduce new uses of technology to make the Judiciary more accessible and efficient, among other areas.

Starting in 2013, the Chief Justice chaired a Joint Committee on Criminal Justice, composed of judges, the Attorney General, Public Defender, representatives of the executive and legislative branches, the ACLU, and private practitioners.  In March 2014, the Committee issued a final report that called for bail reform and the enactment of a state speedy trial act.

As part of wholesale revisions to the pending system of pretrial release, the Committee proposed that defendants be released based on objective measures of risk and be supervised by pretrial services officers before trial; that judges rely less on imposing "money bail," so that defendants who pose little risk of flight or danger but have limited assets are not held in jail for long periods before trial; and that the State Constitution be amended to allow for pretrial detention of defendants who pose a substantial risk of flight and danger to the community.

The group of recommendations received widespread support and were enacted into law in August 2014. Citizens voted to amend the Constitution in November 2014, and the new law went into effect on January 1, 2017.   The results of the first year of the reforms to the state's criminal justice system are summarized in a report.

Decisions by term

2016–17 Term 
 State v. Ingram – State is not required to call a live witness at a pretrial detention hearing to establish probable cause that defendant committed predicate offense.
 North Jersey Media Group, Inc v. Lyndhurst – Public's substantial interest in disclosure of dash-cam videos from fatal police shooting warranted release of the videos under common law.
 State v. Zuber – Constitutional requirements of Miller v. Alabama applied to consecutive term-of-years sentences that were the practical equivalent of life without parole for juveniles.
 State v. Robertson – Judge may stay license suspension of defendant, convicted in municipal court of driving while intoxicated, while he appeals to Law Division, subject to certain conditions.
 State v. Robinson – Supreme Court clarified and revised rule governing pretrial detention discovery to address probable cause and risk of danger, flight, and obstruction.
 State v. Harper – Amnesty defense, which required transfer or surrender of firearm, did not apply to non-resident defendant charged with unlawful possession of handgun.

2015–16 Term 
 State v. Smith- Disclosure of exculpatory evidence during trial warranted mistrial.
 John J. Robertelli v. N.J. Office of Attorney Ethics- Rule providing for no appeal from decision of District Ethics Committee not to docket grievance does not bar action by Office of Attorney Ethics.
 In re Adoption of J.E.V. – Indigent parent facing termination of parental rights in contested private adoption has right to appointed counsel.
 State v. Lunsford – Going forward, the State must apply for a court order under wiretapping statute to obtain telephone billing or toll records.
 State in the Interest of N.H. – State is required to disclose entire discovery file prior to hearing on motion to waive juvenile court jurisdiction.

2014–15 Term 
 Dublirer v. 2000 Linwood Ave Owners, Inc. – Prohibition on distributing materials in private cooperative apartment building violated resident's state constitutional free speech rights.
 State v. Wright – Third-party intervention doctrine was not applicable warrantless search of a home.
 State v. Dalal – Judges in county where defendant had made alleged threats against judges were required to be recused from presiding over defendant's trial.
 State v. Buckner – Recall of retired judges over age of 70 years does not violate State Constitution.
 State v. Munafo – crime of endangering a helpless victim did not include as an element that the defendant's flight from the scene of the injury increased the risk that further harm would come to the victim.

2013–14 Term
Garden State Equality v. Dow – The State's application for a stay of a trial court order permitting same-sex couples to marry is denied based on the New Jersey State Constitution's guarantee of equal protection for same-sex couples, the real harm to same-sex couples, and a determination that the public interest does not favor a stay.
State v. Morgan – a judge's ex parte communication with a deliberating jury did not cause prejudice warranting a new trial.
State v. O'Driscoll – police officer's mistakes in reading standard statement regarding refusal to take a breath test were not material and did not warrant reversal of defendant's conviction.
In re D.J.B. – Petitioner's prior juvenile delinquency adjudications did not disqualify him from expungement of adult conviction.
State v. Ates – New Jersey's Wiretapping and Electronic Surveillance Control Act is constitutional.
State v. Terry – confidential communications intercepted on a wiretap are covered by marital communications privilege.

2012–13 Term
State v. Earls – The New Jersey Constitution protects an individual's right of privacy in cell-phone location information.
In re Plan for the Abolition of the Council on Affordable Housing – The Executive Reorganization Act does not authorize the Governor to abolish independent state agencies. To abolish the Council on Affordable Housing, the legislative and executive branches must enact new laws passed by the Senate and Assembly and signed by the Governor.
State v. Tedesco – A criminal defendant does not have an absolute right to be absent from his sentencing hearing; trial judges have discretion to decide whether to accept a defendant's waiver of the right to be present.
N.J. Div. of Youth & Family Servs. v. A.L. – The mere fact that an expectant mother used drugs during pregnancy is insufficient to demonstrate "abuse" or "neglect" of a child under New Jersey's child protection statutes.
State v. Sowell – Expert witness's testimony that "an exchange of narcotics took place" was improper because it related to a straightforward factual allegation that was not beyond the understanding of an average juror.

2011–12 Term
State v. Lazo – Improper for a police officer to testify at trial about how and why he assembled a photo array.
N.J. Ass'n of School Administrators v. Schundler – School reforms enacted in 2007-08 that limit certain benefits for certain school administrators did not violate either the state constitution or pre-existing tenure statutes.
Mazdabrook Commons Homeowners' Ass'n v. Khan – Homeowner's association cannot prohibit residents from posting political signs in the windows of their own homes.
In re Kollman – Trial court erred in denying petitioner's expungement application
Sussex Commons Assocs., LLC v. Rutgers – Records related to cases at a public law school clinic are not subject to the Open Public Records Act (OPRA).
State v. Herrerra – Where a defendant is subject to an unlawful traffic stop and then commits an additional crime (i.e., attempts to murder the police officer who pulled him over), the illegality of the traffic stop does not provide a basis for suppressing evidence of the subsequent crime.

2010–11 Term
State v. Henderson and State v. Chen (companion cases) – Revised legal standard for assessing eyewitness identification by (1) allowing defendants who demonstrate suggestiveness to present all relevant evidence on identification and (2) requiring more detailed jury charges regarding identification.
Too Much Media, LLC v. Hale – The "newsperson's privilege" does not extend to a self-described journalist who posted comments on an Internet message board.
Henry v. Department of Human Services (concurring) – The majority opinion authored by Judge Edwin Stern, serving by temporary assignment to the Supreme Court, is valid law, and Judge Stern's temporary assignment does not violate the state constitution.
Johnson v. Johnson (concurring) – Disagreement over Judge Stern's temporary assignment to the Supreme Court is not a valid basis for an Associate Justice's decision to abstain from pending cases.
The Committee to Recall Robert Menendez v. Wells – The federal constitution does not give states the power to recall United States senators, and the portion of the state constitution authorizing such recalls is unconstitutional.

2009–10 Term
State v. McCabe – Part-time municipal court judges must recuse themselves whenever the judge and a lawyer for a party are adversaries in some other open, unresolved matter.
Stengart v. Loving Care Agency, Inc. – Attorney-client privilege protects employee's communications with her lawyer even when the statements are made through personal, web-based e-mail on employer-provided laptop.
State v. J.G. – The cleric-penitent privilege applies when, under the totality of the circumstances, an objectively reasonable penitent would believe that a communication was secret, that is, made in confidence to a cleric in the cleric's professional character or role as a spiritual advisor.
State v. Marquez – When informing a motorist of the consequences of refusing to submit to a Breathalyzer test, a police officer must provide the statement in a language the person speaks or understands.

2008–09 Term
State v. Fajardo-Santos – Trial judge may increase bail for undocumented immigrant in criminal case after U.S. Immigration & Customs Enforcement (ICE) begins removal proceedings against defendant.
Mt. Holly Board of Education v. Mt. Holly Education Ass'n –
Burnett v. Bergen County – Established seven-factor test for determining whether individual requesting documents under OPRA must pay cost of redacting Social Security numbers from those documents before release.
State v. A.O. – Forbid uncounseled stipulations admitting defendant's polygraph results; recognized that witness's false criminal accusations may be relevant to witness's credibility regardless of whether made before or after underlying accusation.
State v. Slater – Established four-factor test for plea withdrawals.

2007–08 Term
DeNike v. Cupo – Ordered re-trial in case where plaintiff's counsel offered legal job to trial judge while instant case was pending.
Mason v. Hoboken – Under NJ's Open Public Records Act (OPRA), requestor of government documents entitled to attorney's fees when they demonstrate (1) a nexus between their litigation and the relief achieved and (2) that the relief had a basis in law.
Shotmeyer v. N.J. Realty Title Ins. Co. – Insurance policy obtained by general partnership when it purchased the property lapsed when the property was voluntarily conveyed to a separate and distinct partnership formed by the same individuals.
State v. Luna – Reversed conviction when lack of proof that defendant knowingly waived his right to be present at trial.
State v. Reid – Citizens have a reasonable expectation of privacy in the subscriber information they provide to Internet service providers.
State v. Sloane – During a motor vehicle stop, the passenger, like the driver, is seized under the federal and state constitutions.
State v. Taffaro – Reversed conviction when trial judge's questioning of defendant suggested disbelief of his testimony.

See also
 Barack Obama Supreme Court candidates

References

External links
Justice Stuart Rabner, New Jersey Supreme Court
New Jersey Attorney General biography, version from Internet Archive copied as of April 2, 2007
Stuart Rabner, New Jersey Attorney General
NJ lawyers rally around Rabner as Christie weighs his fate

|-

1960 births
21st-century American judges
20th-century American Jews
Assistant United States Attorneys
Chief Justices of the Supreme Court of New Jersey
Harvard Law School alumni
Living people
New Jersey Attorneys General
New Jersey Democrats
Passaic High School alumni
People from Caldwell, New Jersey
Politicians from Passaic, New Jersey
Princeton School of Public and International Affairs alumni
21st-century American Jews